Michael Franks is a smooth vocal jazz album, and the eponymous debut studio album of American singer-songwriter and musician Michael Franks. Released in 1973 with Brut, the album was re-released in 1983 under the title Previously Unavailable.

Track listing

Personnel
 Michael Franks – vocals, banjo, mandolin
 Kenny Shroyer – trombone
 Lloyd Ulyate – trombone
 Chauncey Welsch – trombone
 Ollie Mitchell – trumpet
 Mike Price – trumpet
 Tony Terran – trumpet
 Gene Cipriano – French horn
 Tom Scott – saxophone
 Jerry McGee – guitar
 Louis Shelton – guitar
 Tommy Tedesco – guitar
 Bobby Bruce – violin
 Larry Muhoberac – piano
 David Paich – piano
 Maurice Rodgers – piano
 Richard Markowitz – autoharp
 Wendy Waldman – vocals, dulcimer
 Max Bennett – bass
 Carol Kaye – bass
 Steve LaFever – bass
 Larry Bunker – drums
 Ed Greene – drums
 Paul Humphrey – drums

References

Bibliography

External links

1973 debut albums
Michael Franks (musician) albums
1973 albums